MS Viking Grace is  a cruiseferry constructed at STX Europe Turku Shipyard, Finland for the Finland-based ferry company Viking Line. The ship was delivered to her owners on 10 January 2013, and entered service on 13 January 2013. She is the first large-scale passenger ferry to be powered by liquefied natural gas (LNG) as well as being fitted with a rotor sail.

Viking Grace replaced MS Isabella (now known as MS Isabelle) on the Turku-Långnäs-Stockholm route. Viking Grace is planned to be twinned by MS Viking Glory, which is currently under test runs.

Viking Line and STX Finland made a contract of building the ship (shipyard project number NB 1376) on 25 October 2010, and the contract went into force on 22 December 2010. The contract price was about 240 million euro, and the ship was delivered in January 2013. The contract included an option of an additional ship. Constructing the ship took 2600 man-years.

Principal particulars
Viking Grace is the most environment-friendly of all large cruiseferries. She uses liquefied natural gas (LNG) as fuel, making emissions to the air minimal. The emissions of LNG include hardly any sulphur dioxide (SO2) or small particles. Also nitrogen oxide (NOx) emissions are reduced by 90% and carbon dioxide emissions by 20% compared to use of fuel refined from oil. The ship also uses a new kind of marine gas oil (MGO) until the LNG terminals have been completed. The intent is to be able to refuel the ship with LNG from both Turku and Stockholm. The ship can travel two to three days with one refuelling. Also the ship's wave forming and noise have been kept to a minimum as it has been designed to travel in an archipelago.

According to Viking Line's CEO Mikael Backman the Viking Grace has the largest panorama windows on the Baltic Sea cruiseferries. The common spaces of the ship are on the sides, and they offer wide views out onto the sea.

The ship has a deadweight tonnage of 6,107 DWT and a gross tonnage of 57,565 GT, which gives maximum passenger capacity for 2,800 people. The vessel has 880 rooms, restaurants, bars, spa and shopping centers. MS Viking Grace also has 1,000 lane meters space for cars and 1,275 lane meters for storage of ro-ro cargo.

Engineering

Viking Grace is driven by four diesel/gas Wärtsilä 8L50DF electric engines, each with power of 10,100 HP, and was the first LNG-powered passenger ship.

Rotor sail
Viking Grace is the first modern passenger ship to be fitted with a rotor sail, which allows for hybrid usage of LNG and wind power. The technology, called Rotor Sail Solution, was developed by the Finnish company Norsepower and has produced a fuel saving of up to 20% in favourable wind conditions. The rotor sail was first used on a voyage from Turku to Stockholm on 12 April 2018.

The rotor cylinder has a height of 24.00 m and a width of 4.00 m. During operation, the cylinder is rotated by shipboard motors and creates thrust from the ambient airflow via the Magnus effect. This form of propulsion was developed and patented by the German engineer Anton Flettner in 1922.

The rotor sail was removed during maintenance operations in 2021. According to the information officer of Viking Line it is difficult to estimate the sail's effect on LNG consumption, because conditions on the sea vary from day to day.

Decks

 Deck 13  Helicopter deck.

 Deck 12  Sun deck, outside deck bar open from May to August.

 Deck 11  Oscar à la carte, Seamore Champagne Lounge, Wine Shop, Frank's Casual Dining, gaming room, children's play room, Spa Wellness and Club Vogue (upper level).

 Deck 10  Buffet Aurora, Arcade, Sweet & Salty Café, Retro Bar & Dancing, Rockmore Bar, gaming room, children's play room, casino, sun deck and Club Vogue (lower level).
 Deck 9  Shopping World duty free shop, Teens, gaming room, information desk, conference rooms, Victoria's Secret, bridge, café, cabins of classes PRM, ID2, SH3 and IP2.
 Deck 8  Cabins of classes SU1, SU2, PRM, SD2, ID2, S4, I4, I2, IH4 and IP2.
 Deck 7  Cabins of classes SU3, SU4, PRM, SD2, ID3, S4, I4, I2, IH4, S4R and I4R, embarkation and disembarkation.
 Deck 6  Cabins of classes SD2, ID2, S4, I4, IH4, DH4, SH4, SF6 and IF6, embarkation and disembarkation.
 Deck 5  Cabins of classes S4, I4, IP2 and Driver, car deck.
 Deck 4  Car deck (for personal cars only, deck can be lifted up).
 Deck 3  Car deck (for all cars).
 Deck 2  Machinery room and crew quarters.
 Deck 1  Machinery room and crew quarters.

Services

Restaurants and cafés
 The Buffet  Traditional buffet restaurant, deck 10, 520 places, named Buffet Aurora until 2018.
 Oscar à la carte  Scandinavian à la carte restaurant, deck 11, 230 places.
 Sweet & Salty Café  Confectionery products, savoury snacks and drinks, deck 10, 140 places.
 Frank's Casual Dining  A casual combination of a fast food restaurant and an à la carte restaurant, serving for example hamburgers and salads, deck 11, 260 places.
 Family Terrace Kiosk  Upper deck café, open from May to August, deck 12.

Bars and night clubs

 Club Vogue  Main night club on two levels, starring artists and the company's mascot Ville Viking, decks 10 to 11, 600 places.
 Retro Bar & Dining  The ship's living room, featuring for example bingo, karaoke and sing-along, also functions as a café, deck 10, 150 places.
 Rock More Bar  A rock'n'roll music bar, deck 10, 100 places.
 Seamore Champagne Bar  A wine and champagne bar, featuring coffee and tea moments, deck 11, 58 places.
 Summer Vogue Bar  An outer deck bar, selling drinks and ice cream, deck 10.

Shops
 Shopping World Tax Free  A duty free shop covering 1600 square metres, featuring candy, drinks, cosmetics, clothes, gifts and toys, deck 9.
 Victoria's Secret Shop  A small shop selling Victoria's Secret cosmetics products, deck 9.
 Kiosk  A small shop in connection with the information desk, open 24 hours, deck 9.
 Wine Shop  A small shop for wines, deck 11.

Children and youths
 Kids 10  A play room for children aged 0 to 6, deck 10.
 Kids 11  A play room for children aged 7 to 11, deck 11.
 Teens  A gaming room for children aged 12 to 17, deck 9.
 Other  A children's play place on the outer deck and the conference rooms can be used as a children's play world during the summer vacation period.

Wellness
 Spa and Wellness  The ship's spa and sauna facilities, including treatments, saunas, Jacuzzis and a snow cave, deck 11.
 Sauna  Deck 11.

Other
 Information desk  Deck 9.
 Conference rooms  Deck 9.
 PAF Casino  Deck 10.
 Video Games  Deck 10.
 Deposit boxes  Deck 9.

Cabins

With Viking Grace, Viking Line changed the class designations of the cabins from letter and number combinations to more descriptive names. The names have also since been changed on other Viking Line ships. All cabins have a toilet, a shower and a TV. Cabins for the disabled and suites have a doorway width of 89 cm, other cabins 64 cm.

 Suite (SU1, SU2, SU3, SU4)  Four different suites with a double bed and a sofa bed with special breakfast for four people. Also a fridge with refreshments. Some suites also have a hot tub. Floor surface 41 to 45 m2.
 Premium (PRM)  A more classy cabin with a large window for four people with a double bed and a Sofa bed. A fridge with refreshments and a special breakfast are included in the price. Floor surface 13.8 m2.
 Seaside Double (SD2)  A spacious cabin with a window, for two people. A double bed. Floor surface 9.7 m2.
 Seaside Four (S4)  A cabin with a window, for four people. Two bunk beds with two levels each. Floor surface 9.4 to 9.7 m2.
 Seaside Four R (S4R)  A cabin with a window without a full-scale floor mat. Two bunk beds with two levels each. Floor surface 9.4 m2.
 Seaside Family (SF6)  A combination of two separate cabins for a maximum of six people (at least one adult and two children). An interior door. One cabin has a double bed and the other has two bunk beds with two levels each. Floor surface 19.4 m2.
 Inside Double (ID2)  A cabin without a window, for two people. A double bed. Floor surface 9.4 to 9.7 m2.
 Inside Double Three (ID3)  A cabin without a window, for three people. A double bed with an additional bed above it. Floor surface 9.7 m2.
 Inside Four (I4)  A cabin without a window, for four people. Two bunk beds with two levels each. Floor surface 9.4 to 9.7 m2.
 Inside Four R (I4R)  A cabin without a window, for four people, without a full-scale floor mat. Two bunk beds with two levels each. Floor surface 9.5 m2.
 Inside Two (I2)  A cabin without a window, for two people. Two separate beds. Floor surface 9.4 m2.
 Inside Family (IF6)  A combination of two separate cabins for a maximum of six people (at least one adult and two children). An interior door. One cabin has a double bed and the other has two bunk beds with two levels each. Floor surface 19.4 m2.
 Seaside HC Four (SH4)  A cabin with a window, for four people. Designed for the disabled. Two bunk beds with two levels each. Floor surface 17.5 m2.
 Inside HC Four (IH4)  A cabin without a window, for four people. Designed for the disabled. Two bunk beds with two levels each. Floor surface 14 m2.
 Double HC Four (DH4)  A cabin with a window, for four people. Designed for the disabled. One double bed and one bunk bed. Floor surface 19.1 m2.
 Seaside HC Three (SH3)  A cabin with a window, for three people. Designed for the disabled. A bunk bed with two lower beds and one upper bed. Floor surface 12.2 to 12.8 m2.
 Inside Piccolo Two (IP2)  A small cabin without a window, for two people. One bunk bed. Floor surface 5.5 m2.
 Driver  A small cabin without a window, for two people. One bunk bed. Floor surface 5.4 m2.

From plan to contract

Viking Line had been planning new ships on the route from Turku to Stockholm for a long time. The route had been trafficked by the ships MS Isabella and MS Amorella, both built in the late 1980s.

Viking Line designed advanced technical solutions for the Turku - Mariehamn - Stockholm route. According to the chief technical officer Kaj Jansson, the intent was to design fast ships with narrow hulls, which would travel lightly in the water and whose environmental effects would be minimal.

Viking Line was already in negotiations in 2009 with the Finnish natural gas company Gasum about using LNG as fuel for the new ship. Viking Line's CEO at the time Nils-Erik Eklund said that LNG was the fuel of the future in ship traffic and that Viking Line had been investigating it for a long time. Still in 2009 Eklund declined to comment whether the new ship would use LNG, one of the reasons being the development of its price. Still he emphasised that LNG would offer significant ecological benefits. For the use of LNG, a new LNG terminal would be built in Naantali or in the Pansio harbour area in Turku.

In January 2010 Mikael Backman said that Viking Line was in negotiations with nine shipyards. Answers for the offer requests were awaited during the spring. In the same interview Backman said that Viking Line would decide on the order during 2010. He emphasised that it was not the intent to build a ship similar to MS Amorella but instead a fully different, significantly larger ship. Making larger ships would also cause renovation work with Viking Line's Turku and Stockholm terminals so they could handle increased passenger traffic. The second level of the Turku terminal would be expanded, the passenger bridges would be elevated and the harbour would possibly have a new parking house. Backman also said that Viking Line would be happy to choose the Turku shipyard, even if the price was higher than with competing shipyards. However, supports received by competing shipyards gave them an advantage in the pricing contest.

On 3 June 2010 Viking Line announced that it had not received a satisfactory answer from the shipyards it had left an offer request at. Particularly the Turku shipyard took this announcement gravely, because Viking Line had in practice two options: order the ship from the Turku shipyard or do not order it at all. According to estimates, Viking Line would have had a great defeat in its image had it ordered the ship from abroad. The new ship order would still not have fulfilled the capacity of the Turku shipyard after it had finished its latest order at the time, Allure of the Seas in October 2010, but would still have kept it in action and its subcontractors working. According to Backman, the ships would still be ordered, but he also said that there was no information on how far the order would be delayed.

According to Viking Line, the price was nowhere near right on any of the shipyards. Because of the practically nonexistent demands of the shipyards the order prices should have been reasonable, and the government support package should have levelled the price differences between the parties. Viking Line needed new ships to replace the old ones, and the contest between the ship companies should have favoured ship orders. Still, no order was made at the time.

In June 2010 Mikael Backman said Viking Line had left a new offer to STX Finland. Two shipyards were left in the negotiations at the time.

Contract about the ship
On 25 October 2010 Viking Line and STX Finland made a contract about building the ship. According to Viking Line the contract still depended on environmental support from the Finnish state. On 26 October 2010 no decision to support Viking Line's ship order was made in the additional budget negotiations of the Finnish government. According to Prime Minister of Finland Mari Kiviniemi a provision to give the support would be extended to 2011, but possible decisions would be made in an economic-political minister board. The CEO of STX Finland Juha Heikinheimo said that conceptual design work of the ship had already been going on for a long time. According to him, the proper design work started as soon as the contract was signed. Viking Line was also in negotiations with Gasum about providing the gas to Turku and Stockholm. The ship order also depended on the result of the negotiations with Gasum.

On 21 December 2010 the financial board of the Finnish government supported the environmental support decision of the ministry of traffic and communications. A support grant of 28 million euro was given to Viking Line for investments to improve the environmental protection of the ships, meaning to build a new ship. The support program still required acceptance from the European Commission for Viking Line's support request. The support would be given to Viking Line after the ship had been delivered and added to the merchant ship list, however in 2012 at the earliest.

On the next day 22 December Viking Line and STX Finland announced that the ship building contract had entered into force. Conditions in the contract included getting environmental support. Backman also said that Viking Line was in negotiations about getting fuel for the new ship with three Finnish companies and the Swedish company AGA AB.

Construction

Construction of the hull of the ship started on the Turku shipyard on 28 September 2011 when Viking Line's CEO Mikael Backman started the steel production for the ship. A contest was held for the ship's name during the change of the year from 2011 to 2012, and Viking Line's board chose Viking Grace as the winner on 17 February 2012. According to the company, the name represents style, design and feeling. Her keel was laid on 6 March 2012, where her keel was lowered onto nine euro coins struck in 2012. The coins belong the Suomenlinna commemorative series and include the entire run of euro coins (€2, €1, 50 c, 20 c, 10 c, 5 c, 2 c and 1 c) and the Suomenlinna commemorative coin. When the hull was complete and the ship was ready to be launched, the coins were picked up and welded onto the ship's mast. Viking Line announced on 10 May 2012 that it is not going to order a sister ship for Viking Grace, so she will probably remain as a unique vessel in the company's fleet. Viking Grace was launched from the Turku shipyard on Friday 10 August. Filling the shipyard pool was started on 10 August 2012, but the water was only filled up to the top of the support pillars at first, in order to check the ship's watertightness. At noon on 11 August 2012 the ship was moved to the equipment bay.

During the night from 22 to 23 November 2012 a water damage was found on the ship, resulting from a failure in a cargo valve. This caused one of the machinery compartments to flood with one metre of water. The water was quickly pumped out of the ship after the ship's own firemen found the leak during the night, and the ship suffered no damage.

Maiden voyage
The ship's maiden voyage was from 13 to 15 January 2013. Viking Line sold all inclusive packages to the cruise, covering a cabin, food, drinks and special programs. The ship was christened before the cruise started. The cruise was sold out in four hours, with prices starting from 350 euro per bed, and by Christmas time 2012 Viking Line had sold 300 thousand voyages. In addition to regular passengers, passengers on the cruise included directors and board members of Viking Line and invited guests.

Incidents
On 21 November 2020, Viking Grace ran aground while attempting to dock at Mariehamn en route from Stockholm to Turku. The ship was towed into the harbour overnight and the 331 passengers and 98 crew, who had slept on board, were evacuated later that morning. No investigation was started about the incident.

References

Notes

External links
 
 Viking Grace Video Clips
 Viking Grace by ShipsReviews.com

Cruiseferries
Ferries of Finland
Ferries of Sweden
Ships built in Turku
2012 ships